Tohen is a settlement in the northeastern Bari province of Somalia. It is situated in the autonomous Puntland region.

Location
It faces the Guardafui Channel, and lies 5 nautical miles (6 miles) south of Cape Guardafui and the Gulf of Aden. The town of Bargal is located 30 nautical miles (35 miles) to the south.

Administration
On April 8, 2013, the Puntland government announced the creation of a new region coextensive with Tohen and Cape Guardafui, named Gardafuul. Carved out of the Bari region, it consists of three districts and has its capital at Alula.

In popular culture
Tohen  and the neighboring lighthouse "Francesco Crispi" are depicted in Andrei Gusev's novel Once in Malindi (in Chapter 22).

See also
Maritime history of Somalia
Geography of Somalia

References

Bari, Somalia
Geography of Somalia